John Evans (21 October 1932 – February 2009) was an English professional footballer who played as an inside forward for Sunderland.

References

1932 births
2009 deaths
People from Hetton-le-Hole
Footballers from Tyne and Wear
English footballers
Association football inside forwards
Norwich City F.C. players
Sunderland A.F.C. players
Boston United F.C. players
English Football League players